Lacombe, Lucien  is a 1974 French war drama film by Louis Malle about a French teenage boy during the German occupation of France in World War II.

Plot
In June 1944, as the Allies are fighting the Germans in Normandy, Lucien Lacombe, a 17-year-old country boy, tries to join the Resistance. The local Resistance leader, the village school teacher, turns him down on grounds of age.  Lucien travels back to the town where he works by bicycle and stumbles on the hotel that is the headquarters of the Carlingue, the French auxiliaries of the Gestapo, and is taken into custody.  Under the influence of alcohol, he betrays the teacher, who is brought in and tortured. Seeing that Lucien could be useful, the Carlingue recruit him into their lawless regime of extortion and terror.

He enjoys his new power and position, but falls in love with France Horn, a beautiful French-born Jewish girl living in seclusion with her father Albert, a tailor, and her paternal grandmother Bella, who left Paris in fear and are trying to cross the border into the safety of neutral Spain. Their sophistication stands in contrast to Lucien's uncouth nature and lack of education. Forcing himself into a relationship with the girl, Lucien comes to be protective of the very people targeted by his superiors. He is warned that the Allies are winning and that as a collaborator he will be killed.

Albert goes to Carlingue headquarters to see Lucien to discuss his relationship with his daughter man-to-man but is taken into custody by the head of the Carlingue and turned over to the Germans.  After members of the Resistance attack the hotel, the inhabitants of the town are rounded up in retribution. Lucien and a German soldier arrest France and Bella but Lucien decides to kill the soldier. He takes the women by car toward Spain but the vehicle breaks down and they go on by foot until they find shelter in a secluded and abandoned farmhouse.

A text epilogue states that Lucien Lacombe was arrested on October 12, 1944, tried and condemned to death by a military tribunal of the Resistance, and executed.

Cast
 Pierre Blaise as Lucien Lacombe
 Aurore Clément as France Horn
 Therese Giehse as Bella Horn
 Holger Löwenadler as Albert Horn
 Stéphane Bouy as Jean-Bernard
 Loumi Iacobesco as Betty Beaulieu
 René Bouloc as Faure
 Pierre Decazes as Aubert
 Jean Rougerie as Tonin, chief of police
 Cécile Ricard as Marie, a hotel maid
 Jacqueline Staup as Lucienne Chauvelot
 Ave Ninchi as Mme Georges
 Pierre Saintons as Hippolyte, a black collaborator
 Gilberte Rivet as Lucien's mother
 Jacques Rispal as M. Laborit, the proprietor

Production
Malle wrote the screenplay with novelist Patrick Modiano. Originally, they titled the script Le faucon ("The Falcon") and intended to set it in present-day Mexico, but Malle was not allowed to shoot in Mexico (nor in Chile), so he rewrote the script, giving it a wartime French setting. The script was retitled Le milicien ("The Milice Man").

The movie was filmed in the town of Figeac in southwestern France.

Reception

Critical response
Vincent Canby, film critic for The New York Times, gave it a positive review. He wrote, "Lacombe, Lucien is easily Mr. Malle's most ambitious, most provocative film, and if it is not as immediately affecting as The Fire Within or even the comic Murmur of the Heart, it's because—to make his point—he has centered it on a character who must remain forever mysterious, forever beyond our sympathy."

Pauline Kael wrote of her admiration for Malle's expressive camerawork and visual capabilities. Behind Lucien's blasé, almost empty visage, Kael saw a world of dialogue: "Malle’s gamble is that the cameras will discover what the artist’s imagination can’t, and, steadily, startlingly, the gamble pays off. Without ever mentioning the subject of innocence and guilt, this extraordinary film, in its calm, dispassionate way, addresses it on a very deep level."

Film critic Dan Schneider liked the film, especially Malle's casting of Blaise. Schneider wrote, "Every so often a director makes an inspiring casting choice to not hire a real actor for a role, but go with an unknown, an amateur. Perhaps the best example of this was in Vittorio De Sica's 1952 film Umberto D ... Yet, not that far behind has to be Louis Malle's decision to cast the lead character for his 1974 film, Lacombe, Lucien with an amateur named Pierre Blaise. No actor would likely be able to capture the natural ferality that Blaise brings to the role of a none-too-bright French farm boy who unwittingly, at first, becomes an accomplice and collaborator with the Gestapo in the final months of Vichy France, in late 1944."

Film critic Wheeler Winston Dixon discussed why the film was controversial: "Louis Malle's drama Lacombe, Lucien is one of the most effective films about the capitulation of France to the Nazis during World War II, and one of the most controversial .... Louis Malle's film was daring for its time for suggesting that not every member of the French public was a member of the Resistance; that indeed, many were willing accomplices to the Vichy government, and the sting of the film remains to this day."

Accolades
Wins
 U.S. National Board of Review: NBR Award, Best Supporting Actor, Holger Löwenadler; 1974.
 British Academy of Film and Television Arts: BAFTA Film Award, Best Film; UN Award; 1975.
 French Syndicate of Cinema Critics: Critics Award, Best Film, Louis Malle; 1975.
 National Society of Film Critics Awards, USA: NSFC Award, Best Supporting Actor, Holger Löwenadler; 1975.

Nominations
 U.S. National Board of Review: Best Foreign Language Film; 1974.
 Academy Awards: Oscar, Best Foreign Language Film, France; 1975.
 British Academy of Film and Television Arts: BAFTA Film Award, Best Direction, Louis Malle; Best Screenplay, Louis Malle and Patrick Modiano; 1975. 
 Golden Globes: Golden Globe, Best Foreign Film, France; 1975.

See also
 List of French submissions for the Academy Award for Best Foreign Language Film
 List of submissions to the 47th Academy Awards for Best Foreign Language Film

References

External links
 
 
 
 
Lacombe, Lucien an essay by Pauline Kael at the Criterion Collection
 Lacombe, Lucien images at EyeGate
 

1974 films
1970s coming-of-age drama films
1974 war films
French war drama films
French coming-of-age drama films
1970s French-language films
1970s German-language films
War romance films
French World War II films
Films directed by Louis Malle
Films set in 1944
Best Film BAFTA Award winners
1974 drama films
1970s French films